Wallace Bliss (1871 – 1951) was an English footballer. He was the first player to score a goal in the Football League for Burslem Port Vale.

Career
Bliss joined Burslem Port Vale in August 1892. He made his debut at inside-left on 3 September 1892 as Vale lost 5–1 to Small Heath at Muntz Street; his goal was the club's first in the Football League. He was a regular in the side until December 1892, and was released from the Athletic Ground at the end of the 1892–93 season after having scored three goals in 13 Second Division games.

Career statistics
Source:

References

1871 births
1951 deaths
Sportspeople from Shrewsbury
English footballers
Association football forwards
Port Vale F.C. players
English Football League players